Brady Hjelle (born May 3, 1990) is an American professional ice hockey goaltender currently playing for the Stjernen Hockey of the Norwegian GET-ligaen.

Hjelle played college hockey with the Ohio State Buckeyes in the NCAA Men's Division I CCHA conference. In his senior year, Hjelle's outstanding play was rewarded with a selection to the 2012–13 CCHA All-Conference First Team. Hjelle made his professional debut in the playoffs of the 2012–13 season with the Florida Everblades.

On May 18, 2013, Hjelle signed a contract with Norwegian-based club, Rosenborg IHK of the GET-ligaen.

After the 2013–14 season, Hjelle signed a tryout contract with Tappara of the Liiga in Finland.  However, on August 20, 2014, the team announced that Hjelle had been cut. Remaining in Scandinavia, he moved to Norwegian GET-ligaen in signing for Rosenborg IHK.

On September 10, 2014, Hjelle signalled his return to North America, in signing a one-year contract as a free agent with the Tulsa Oilers of the CHL.

Awards and honors

References

External links 

1990 births
American men's ice hockey goaltenders
Florida Everblades players
Living people
Manglerud Star Ishockey players
Minnesota Duluth Bulldogs men's ice hockey players
Ohio State Buckeyes men's ice hockey players
Rosenborg IHK players
Stjernen Hockey players
Tulsa Oilers (1992–present) players
Ice hockey players from Minnesota
People from International Falls, Minnesota
AHCA Division I men's ice hockey All-Americans